Cerveceria Nacional Dominicana (CND), is the primary beer producer in the Dominican Republic, the company is owned by AmBev and Grupo León Jimenes. It was founded in 1929 by the American entrepreneur Charles H. Wanzer.  It was the first brewery in the Dominican Republic and the largest in the Antilles and Central America with sales of 3.8 million hectoliters. It first released its major brand Presidente in 1935, and has since expanded to other brands such as Bohemia Especial, Presidente Light and Ambar.  The first two are pilsener beers that fall in the category of lager beers, and the latter is the company's first incursion into dark beer. Its current brewery complex was opened in 1951. It employs 2,500 people and produces up to 500 million liters of beer.

The CND's facilities have been certified ISO 9001/2000 and 14001/2004.

AmBev
In June 2012, Anheuser-Busch InBev's Brazilian unit AmBev agreed to buy a controlling stake in the Dominican Republic-based brewer Cerveceria Nacional Dominicana (CND) for over $1.2 billion, forming the biggest beverage company in the Caribbean. The purchase was for a 41% stake in the CND from Grupo Leon Jimenes and an additional $200 million for Heineken's 10% stake in the CND, giving AmBev 51% majority ownership of the CND.

Products

Beers
Presidente- Pilsner with 5% abv. Created in 1935.
Presidente Light- Light Pilsner with 4.1% abv. Created in 2005.
Bohemia Especial- Pilsner with 7.2% abv. Created in 1983.
Bohemia Especial Light- Light Pilsner with 4.3% abv. Created in 2009.
The One- Pilsner with 4.7% abv. Created in 2006.
Brahma Light

Maltas
Malta Morena
Löwenbräu
Vita Malt Plus
Malta Bohemia

Soft Drinks
Red Rock (beverage)
Enriquillo
Guaraná Antarctica

Rums
Barceló- award-winning rum that began production in 1930.

Energizers 
911

List of chairmen

References

Beer in the Caribbean
Drink companies of the Dominican Republic
Food and drink companies established in 1929
Dominican Republic cuisine
PepsiCo bottlers